Kate Leary (born August 10, 1993) is an American ice hockey forward, currently playing for the Metropolitan Riveters of the Premier Hockey Federation.

Career 

Across four seasons with Boston College, Leary never missed a game, and was awarded the Athletic Director’s Award for Academic Achievement Honours in her sophomore season.

Leary's rookie season in the CWHL came the year the formation of the NWHL, which saw many star players switch leagues. Joining the CWHL, Leary quickly became one of the top scorers for the Boston Blades, scoring 10 goals and 6 assists in 24 games, almost a third of the team's goals, and the highest scoring American player in the league.

After two years in the CWHL, Leary left to play for HC Lugano in Switzerland, where she scored 33 goals in 20 games, and was the league's leading scorer, and won the league championship.

After just one year in Switzerland, Leary returned to North America, signing with the Riveters of the NWHL. In her first season, she put up 27 points in 22 games, and was named to Team Packer for the All-Star Game.

Personal life 

Leary has also competitively played lacrosse and field hockey. She grew up in the Boston area, graduating from Governor’s Academy in Byfield.

Outside of sports, she has a degree in psychology.

Career statistics

References

External links
 

1993 births
Living people
American women's ice hockey forwards
Metropolitan Riveters players
Boston Blades players
HC Lugano players
People from Seabrook, New Hampshire
Boston College alumni
The Governor's Academy alumni
Sportspeople from Rockingham County, New Hampshire
21st-century American women